Dead Synchronicity (full title Dead Synchronicity: Tomorrow Comes Today) is an episodic point-and-click adventure game set in a post-apocalyptic future. The game was partly funded through the Kickstarter crowd-funding website, with the first episode released in April 2015.

Development
Fictiorama Studios consists of three brothers, Mario, Luis, and Alberto Oliván, and artist Martín Martínez. This story was pitched by Alberto, and the art, plot, and music were designed to fit his vision. The developers cited influences such as The Secret of Monkey Island, 12 Monkeys, and The Road, among others.  The art style borrows from expressionism and tribal art.

One of the main challenges for the production team was designing the non-linear narrative and complex branching-tree dialogue, eventually settling on a software called articy:draft to collect all the data needed to streamline this process.

The game was partly funded through the Kickstarter crowd-funding website, raising $51,501 in April 2014.

Plot
The player controls Michael, an amnesiac who wakes up in the apocalyptic New World, where many humans, called "the Dissolved", have a terminal disease. Michael explores the areas, trying to work out what is really going on, all the while confused by strange visions and dreams that cloud his mind.

According to the studio, the game features "space-time distortions, a dystopian atmosphere... and a dark, bloodstained plot".

Reception
The game has a Metacritic rating of 70%, based on 24 critic reviews. According to Carsten Fichtelmann of Daedalic Entertainment, Dead Synchronicity was a commercial flop. He said in 2016, "Unfortunately, it did not sell well, only a few thousand units, so we had to say to the developers that we cannot put money in a second game, because we lost money with its first part."

PC World praised the game as a brave and "surprisingly disturbing" title, but said it lacked a "catharsis" due to its abrupt end and lack of narrative cohesion in gameplay. John Walker, writing at Rock, Paper, Shotgun had been very enthusiastic about the game during its Kickstarter campaign. However, upon reviewing the first chapter, he too was disappointed with its abrupt ending.

The PlayStation 4 port received positives reviews, with Crash Landed scoring it 4 stars, praising the game's control method: "Developers Fictiorama Studios have gone a step further and transformed Dead Synchronicity - a game that would usually be more suited for the PC space - to feel right at home on the console using a controller, thanks to some smart game design decisions." Kai Powell of wccftech scored the game a 7.7, praising its "macabre" setting; meanwhile, Jose A. Rodríguez of IGN scored the title 7.8.

See also
Do Not Feed the Monkeys

References

External links
Dead Synchronicity official website

2015 video games
Android (operating system) games
IOS games
Kickstarter-funded video games
Point-and-click adventure games
Post-apocalyptic video games
Video games developed in Spain
MacOS games
PlayStation 4 games
Windows games
Nintendo Switch games